Sandwich railway station serves Sandwich in Kent, England. The station, and all trains serving it, are operated by Southeastern.

History

The first proposal for a station at Sandwich was in 1836–37 by the Kent Railway. The station was opened on 1 July 1847.

Sandwich had once been a significant port in the Middle Ages, but because of changing geography had suffered a lengthy decline. It was hoped a railway would reverse this trend. In 1853, the Sandwich Improvement Association hoped to collaborate with the SER and develop a more significant seaport here, but the SER were not interested. The station initially had a very limited service, with only seven trains running each way, and between 1855 and 1865 the line was single track. A connection to  opened on 15 June 1881.

Goods services were withdrawn on 7 October 1963.

In 2019, a major programme began to expand the station in preparation for The Open Championship at the Royal St George's Golf Club. The platforms were extended to  so they could accommodate the full 12-car British Rail Class 395 trains. The work was completed in early 2021, in time for the 2021 Open Championship

Services 
All services at Sandwich are operated by Southeastern using  and  EMUs.

The typical off-peak service in trains per hour is:
 1 tph to London St Pancras International
 1 tph to 

During the peak hours, the station is also served by a number of services between Ramsgate and London Charing Cross via .

References
Citations

Sources

External links 

Sandwich, Kent
Railway stations in Kent
DfT Category E stations
Former South Eastern Railway (UK) stations
Railway stations in Great Britain opened in 1847
Railway stations served by Southeastern